Arlie Schardt (Alfred E. Schardt; April 24, 1895 – March 2, 1980) was an American athlete who competed mainly in the 3000 metre team. He was born in Milwaukee, Wisconsin and died in Clearwater, Florida.

Schardt competed for the United States in the 1920 Summer Olympics held in Antwerp, Belgium in the 3000 metre team where he won the gold medal with his teammates Horace Brown and Ivan Dresser.

References

1895 births
1980 deaths
Track and field athletes from Milwaukee
American male middle-distance runners
Athletes (track and field) at the 1920 Summer Olympics
Olympic gold medalists for the United States in track and field
Medalists at the 1920 Summer Olympics